A number translation service translates a dialled telephone number, typically beginning 08 in the UK to a geographical 'connect number' beginning 01 or 02 in the UK. The connect number may be changed without changing the published dialled number. Originally NTS numbers were used, for example, to allow any caller to dial a local call to the called party irrespective of location, saving money if the connect number was not also a local call, but the system gradually came to be seen as a way of making money and now most phone companies charge the caller more for 08 numbers than for 01, 02 or 03 numbers.

References

External links 
 www.ofcom.org.uk

Telecommunications in the United Kingdom